Alberto Heredia Ceballos-Zúñiga (born 2 March 1987) is a Spanish footballer who plays for Rota as a forward.

Football career
Born in Cádiz, Andalusia, Heredia played youth football at Real Madrid, sharing teams with future Spanish international Juan Mata. He made his senior debuts with Sevilla Atlético, appearing rarely as the Andalusian side promoted to Segunda División for the first time ever.

In the following three years, Heredia continued in Segunda División B: in the 2007–08 season he represented UD Marbella and Burgos CF, being relegated with the former. Subsequently, he met the same fate with both Santa Eulàlia and Terrassa FC, finishing the latter campaign with Getafe CF's reserves in Tercera División.

In January 2012, after one 1/2 seasons in Italy with S.S. Chieti Calcio, Heredia returned to his country and signed for Lorca Atlético CF. He followed that with a stin in Kazakhstan with Kairat. He moved to the Nicaraguan side Real Estelí on 24 January 2013. 

He returned to Spain in 2015, and has since has stints with Sanluqueño, Conquense, Eldense, Alcobendas, Guadalajara, Conil, Xerez Deportivo, and most recently Rota.

Club statistics

References

External links

1987 births
Living people
Footballers from Cádiz
Spanish footballers
Association football forwards
Segunda División B players
Tercera División players
Sevilla Atlético players
Marbella FC players
Burgos CF footballers
Terrassa FC footballers
Getafe CF B players
UB Conquense footballers
CD Eldense footballers
CD Guadalajara (Spain) footballers
S.S. Chieti Calcio players
Kazakhstan Premier League players
FC Kairat players
Real Estelí F.C. players
Spanish expatriate footballers
Spanish expatriate sportspeople in Italy
Spanish expatriate sportspeople in Kazakhstan
Expatriate footballers in Italy
Expatriate footballers in Kazakhstan
Expatriate footballers in Nicaragua
Lorca Atlético CF players